Conscription has never been implemented in China since 1949 as the People's Liberation Army has been able to recruit sufficient numbers voluntarily. Residents of Special Administrative Regions (Hong Kong and Macau), are exempted from joining the military.

Registering for the draft
The Chinese system operates through a process of draft registration. The process for registering for the draft is written in Part 13, Article II of the Military Service Law of the People's Republic of China. Citizens who reach the age of 18 by 31 December of the year should register for the draft before 30 June of the year. Those who meet the physical requirement become registered draft-capable citizens.

Technically, military service with the PLA is obligatory for all Chinese citizens. In practice, mandatory military service has not been implemented since 1949 as the People's Liberation Army has been able to recruit sufficient numbers voluntarily. All 18-year-old males have to register themselves with the government authorities, in a way similar to the Selective Service System of the United States. In practice, registering does not mean that the person doing so must join the People's Liberation Army.

Article 55 of the Constitution of the People's Republic of China prescribes conscription by stating: "It is a sacred duty of every citizen of the People's Republic of China to defend his or her motherland and resist invasion. It is an honoured obligation of the citizens of the People's Republic of China to perform military service and to join the militia forces." The 1984 Military Service Law spells out the legal basis of conscription, describing military service as a duty for "all citizens without distinction of race... and religious creed". This law has not been amended since it came into effect. Technically, those 18–22 years of age enter selective compulsory military service, with a 24-month service obligation. In reality, numbers of registering personnel are enough to support all military posts in China, creating so-called "volunteer conscription".

Punishment
Despite the fact that mandatory military service has not been implemented since 1949, the already enlisted people who are proved to have avoided the draft are liable for punishment, and Beijing authorities criticize those youths who do not want to join the army.

See also
Selective Service System, a similar system in the United States.
Taiping Rebellion

References

 
Military of China
China